"The Whole Truth" is the 41st episode of Lost. It is the 16th episode of the second season. The episode was directed by Karen Gaviola, and written by Elizabeth Sarnoff and Christina M. Kim. It first aired on March 22, 2006, on ABC. The character of Sun Kwon (Yunjin Kim) is featured in the episode's flashbacks, which revolve around her and Jin Kwon's (Daniel Dae Kim) fertility problems.

Plot

Flashbacks
In their apartment, Sun and Jin are about to make love, when Jin asks Sun if she took her temperature, ruining the mood. He says they've been trying for a year to conceive, and he thinks she should see a fertility doctor. Sun asks why he wants a baby he will never see. Jin says he's sorry for the things Sun's father makes him do and that a baby would change everything. The fertility doctor, however, advises them that Sun cannot conceive due to advanced endometriosis.

Sun enters a hotel room to meet Jae Lee, her suitor from before she met Jin. Their conversation indicates the two are regularly meeting to teach English and seek advice on Sun's relationship. She tells Jae that she was glad to learn about her infertility. Jae asks her why she's learning English, to which Sun replies that she's leaving Jin for America. Jae tells Sun that one can't run away from their life. Sun asks if Jin is her life and Jae says he's not saying she should stay for Jin.

Sun is walking her dog when the fertility doctor drives by and confesses to Sun that it's actually Jin who can't have children. He tells her he lied because if Jin found out it was he who could not have children, Jin would burn down his practice.

On the island
An angry Jin tries to take Sun away from her garden and back to the beach, given her previous abduction from the garden. They have an argument and Jin pulls out all of the plants. She runs to the beach and, in pain, meets Bernard and Rose, who are having an argument of their own. She later asks Sawyer for a pregnancy test, which turns out to be manufactured by Widmore labs.

Locke convinces Ana Lucia that given her police training and encounters with the Others, she should interrogate Henry Gale. He repeats the balloon story and draws a map to the balloon, where he had buried his wife. Ana Lucia promises that she'll keep him alive if the map confirms his story. Together with Sayid and Charlie (whom Sayid have told previously about the prisoner in the hatch's armory), she goes in search for the balloon. Ana Lucia realizes from Charlie's gait that he's carrying a concealed gun, and asks him to give it to someone who knows how to use it. Charlie replies with “the last time you had a gun you murdered someone” and gives the gun to Sayid.

As Sun is waiting for her pregnancy test results to show up, she asks Kate if she has ever taken a test, which she replies that she has. Sun thanks Kate for being there and not asking questions. When the test turns up positive, she does not seem too thrilled. She asks if it is accurate and they go to Jack to find out. He says those tests are very accurate, and that the two pink lines means she is definitely pregnant. Sun asks Jack to not tell anybody.

Ana Lucia joins Sayid by a campfire. She says people dislike her and she has been trying most of her life to get them to like her. She says she gave up a while back and that she is who she is. She tells Sayid he has a good reason to hate her. She apologizes for what she did. Sayid says it wasn’t her fault, and explains that he holds the Others responsible for Shannon's death (as they are the ones who indirectly caused Ana to shoot Shannon); he comments that once they find out if Henry is one of them, something will have to be done.

It’s morning and Sayid waits for Ana Lucia to wake up. Charlie brings papayas for them to eat but Sayid really wants to leave. They find where the balloon should be but it is not there. Ana Lucia insists that they should look some more around the area. Sayid divides the area into three parts and tells Ana Lucia to search as thoroughly as she pleases.

Bernard is searching for an oyster for his wife and Jin tells him (in English) "no oyster here". Sawyer comes up and tells Bernard that Sun is pregnant. They start talking about it, but Jin can't understand them.

Jin goes and replants the plants he pulled out. He tells Sun he hates fighting like they do and that he hates not being able to understand everyone. He apologizes and Sun tells him she’s pregnant. He’s overjoyed and Sun tells him she needs to tell him something. Sun tells Jin he is the one who cannot have children, not her. He asks Sun how she can be pregnant and she promises she did not cheat. He then helps Sun rebuild her garden. Sun asks if she can stay and work in her garden as Jin wants to return to the beach. Jin bends down and kisses Sun. He tells her he loves her in English.

Jack asks Henry how the book is and takes him out of the prison he has been locked in. Henry asks him what the computer is for and Jack says it is for nothing. Henry eats some cereal. He says he figures it’s his reward for drawing the map. Locke and Jack are caught off guard since they didn’t know about the map. Henry then "hypothetically" thinks out loud that if he in fact were one of the Others, he would probably lead them into a trap so when Ana Lucia, Sayid, and Charlie get to where the map leads them, the Others would take them hostage and trade them for him. He then mentions that it's a good thing he's not one of them as he nonchalantly asks if they have any milk for his cereal.

Production
Michael Emerson, who portrays Henry Gale, was originally contracted to appear in just three episodes of Lost, making his first appearance in "One of Them". The producers were so impressed by him that they contracted him for a further five episodes, citing the scene at the end of this episode where Henry asks for milk as the moment they knew he was a "keeper". He was then made a part of the regular cast from the third season.

Reception
15.30 million American viewers viewed this episode.

References

External links

"The Whole Truth" at ABC

Lost (season 2) episodes
2006 American television episodes